Falsodromius erythropus is a species of beetle in the family Carabidae, the only species in the genus Falsodromius.

References

Lebiinae